Henabad-e Sofla (also Romanized as Henābād-e Soflá and Hanābād-e Soflá; also known as Haneh Abad Sofla, Hīnābād-e Pā’īn, Hīnābād Pā’īn, and Hīnābād Soflá) is a village in Peyghan Chayi Rural District, in the Central District of Kaleybar County, East Azerbaijan Province, Iran. At the 2006 census, its population was 139, in 30 families.

References 

Populated places in Kaleybar County